Njarðtaksvöllurinn is a multi-use stadium in Njarðvík, Iceland. It is currently used mostly for football matches and is the home stadium of Njarðvík FC. Its capacity is around 1400.

References

Football venues in Iceland